Bishop Ignatius D'Souza (born 4 August 1964) is the current serving bishop of the Roman Catholic Diocese of Bareilly, India.

Early life 
D'Souza was born on 4 August 1964 in Basrikatte, Karnataka, India to Mr. CL D' Souza and Mrs. Lucy D' Souza.

Education 
Ignatius has acquired a Bachelor of Theology degree, a Bachelor of Arts Degree and Master of Arts (public administration) from Annamalai University. He also holds a licentiate from Pontifical Gregorian University in Biblical studies and Doctorate in Biblical Theology from the Pontifical Urban University.

Priesthood 
Ignatius studied at St. Paul's Minor Seminary and St. Joseph's Regional Seminary in Allahabad and on 7 April 1991 received priestly ordination from Archbishop Cecil DeSa for the Roman Catholic Diocese of Lucknow.

Episcopate 
D'Souza was appointed bishop of the Roman Catholic Diocese of Bareilly on 11 July 2014 and was consecrated by Salvatore Pennacchio on 4 October 2014.

See also 
 List of Catholic bishops of India

References 

1964 births
Living people
21st-century Roman Catholic bishops in India
Pontifical Gregorian University alumni
Pontifical Urban University alumni
Annamalai University alumni
Bishops appointed by Pope Francis